Cornish Crabber may refer to:

Cornish Crabber 17, a British Sailboat design
Cornish Crabber 24, a British Sailboat design